Duchess Dorothea Wilhelmine of Saxe-Zeitz (20 March 1691 – 17 March 1743) was a duchess of Saxe-Zeitz by birth and by marriage Landgravine of Hesse-Kassel.

Life 
Dorothea Wilhelmine was a daughter of the Duke Maurice William of Saxe-Zeitz (1664–1718) from his marriage to Marie Amalie (1670–1739), daughter of the Elector Frederick William I of Brandenburg.  By 1710 all her siblings had died and so, after her father's death Dorothea Wilhelmine was the last surviving member of the house of Saxe-Zeitz.

She married on 27 September 1717 in Zeitz with future Landgrave William VIII of Hesse-Kassel (1682–1760). Queen Caroline of Great Britain reported to the Duchess of Orleans, the Landgravine "was ugly and had a weird head".

Dorothea Wilhelmine became mentally ill and no longer appeared in public after 1725.  The new first lady at court was the Landgrave's favorite Barbara Christine von Bernhold whom he made Countess Bernold of Eschau while Dorothea Wilhelmine was still alive.

Issue 
From their marriage, Dorothea Wilhelmine had the following children:
 Charles (1718–1719)
 Frederick II (1720–1785), Landgrave of Hesse-Kassel
 married 1740 Princess Mary of Great Britain (1723–1772)
 Maria Amalia (1721–1744), she died while engaged to be married with Margrave Charles Frederick Albert of Brandenburg-Schwedt

References 
 Carl Eduard Vehse: Geschichte der deutschen Höfe seit der Reformation p. 152 ff

External links 
 http://www.vhghessen.de/inhalt/zhg/ZHG_106/04_Loewenstein_Hofhaltung.pdf (PDF file, 56 kB)

House of Wettin
1691 births
1743 deaths
18th-century German people
Duchesses of Saxe-Zeitz
Landgravines of Hesse-Kassel
Albertine branch
Daughters of monarchs